Mutant Football League is an American football video game. It is a spiritual successor to Electronic Arts' Mutant League Football. The game was released on Microsoft Windows on October 31, 2017, released for PlayStation 4 and Xbox One on January 19, 2018, and on Nintendo Switch on October 30, 2018.

Development 
The game was developed by American studio Digital Dreams Entertainment, led by Michael Mendheim, designer of the original Mutant League Football game. In 2013, Mendheim ran a Kickstarter campaign to fund the game's development, asking for $750,000. The project failed to reach its goal, but Mendheim persisted with the project. In 2017, a second Kickstarter campaign raised a more modest goal of $60,000. Mendheim stated that due to the original funding failure the game will not have as much content as originally planned, and that the main purpose of the second Kickstarter was to fund development of online multiplayer.

Gameplay 
Mutant Football League is a violent, over-the-top interpretation of the game of football. It draws inspiration from the original Mutant League Football, as well as other games in the genre such as NFL Blitz.

The game features 7-on-7 action, with teams made up of various mutants, namely Skeletal Deadheads, Monstrous Orcs, BruiserBots, Mutant-Humans, Hell-Spawned Demons, Rampaging Werewolves, and Criminal Aliens. The fields are littered with obstacles, including buzzsaws and landmines. Players can call normal plays, as well as "dirty tricks", which include bribing the referee, using a chainsaw to cut through the opposition defense, and rigging the ball with a bomb.

Teams 
Many of the teams are parodies of real-life NFL teams, with names like the Nuked London Hatriots and the Deadlanta Vultures. Many players likewise have humorous names spoofing real-life current and former NFL players, like Bomb Shady, Von Killer, Wham Neutron, Throb Bronkowski, Hatrick Myhomies, Ratspew Splattered, Cooper Pup, and Airbourne Dodgers.

Monster Conference:

Mutant Conference:

Reception

Sequel 
In early 2022, Digital Dreams Entertainment announced Mutant Football League 2. The game is currently in development and scheduled to be released for Xbox Series X|S, Xbox One, PS5, PS4, and PC. It does not currently have a release date.

Notes

References

External links 

2017 video games
American football video games
Fantasy sports video games
Fictional mutants
Kickstarter-funded video games
Multiplayer and single-player video games
Xbox One games
PlayStation 4 games
Nintendo Switch games
Video games about death games
Video games developed in the United States
Video games scored by Brian L. Schmidt
Windows games